Luca Moretti is a Italy international rugby league footballer who plays as a  or  forward for the Parramatta Eels in the NSW Cup.

Background
Moretti is of Italian descent.

Playing career

Club career
Moretti is contracted to the Parramatta Eels in the NRL.

International career
In 2022 Moretti was named in the Italy squad for the 2021 Rugby League World Cup.
Moretti made his Italy debut in the opening round of the 2021 Rugby League World Cup against Scotland which Italy won 28-4.

References

External links
Parramatta Eels profile
Italy profile

Living people
Italy national rugby league team players
Rugby league props
Year of birth missing (living people)